San Mudageri (Small Mudageri) is a hamlet in the district of Karwar, lying halfway between the Karnataka - Goa border and the historic fort of Sadashivgad.

Gallery

Villages in Uttara Kannada district